VDA may refer to:

Science and technology
 VDA-FS, CAD data exchange format
 Vascular disrupting agent, a class of pharmaceutical drugs
 Video Distribution Amplifier

Organizations
 Verband der Automobilindustrie, a special interest group representing the German automobile industry
 VDA 6.1, one of their quality management system standards
 Verein für Deutsche Kulturbeziehungen im Ausland, a German cultural organisation

Other
 Ovda Airport, Eilat, Israel, by IATA code
 Villa Dolores Airport, serving Villa Dolores, Córdoba, Argentina
 Voluntary disclosure agreement, a program in United States taxation
 Viewer discretion advised, in the context of television content rating systems